The Packers–Seahawks rivalry is a rivalry in the National Football League between the Green Bay Packers and the Seattle Seahawks. The Packers and Seahawks first played each other in 1976, the Seahawks' inaugural season. During the 1970s, 1980s, and 1990s, the two teams only played each other intermittently, as they were in different conferences. However, this all changed in 2002, when the Seahawks were moved from the American Football Conference (AFC) to the National Football Conference (NFC), and the teams played each other in the regular season at least every three years, sometimes more often due to division matchups.

As of the 2020 NFL season, the Packers lead the overall series 14–9, including winning 3 out of 4 postseason games. The rivalry has been defined by numerous high profile games, including the 2014 NFC Championship Game, where the Seahawks went on to win in overtime to earn a berth into the Super Bowl. The rivalry has also not been without controversy, with the Fail Mary game in 2012 being perhaps the most notable. The Packers and Seahawks most recent game was on November 14, 2021, with the Packers winning 17–0. It was the first time that the Seahawks were shut out in Green Bay.

Notable games and moments
There have been several memorable games which have cemented the rivalry:

 In the 2003–04 NFL playoffs, the teams met for the first time in the postseason at the Packers' Lambeau Field. Their Wild Card matchup saw numerous lead changes, and the teams were tied 27–27 at the end of regulation time. In overtime, the Seahawks won the coin toss. Seahawks quarterback Matt Hasselbeck (a former Packer) told the microphoned referee, and thus the crowd and the national television audience, "We want the ball, and we're gonna score." After each team went three-and-out, cornerback Al Harris intercepted a Hasselbeck pass and returned it 52 yards for the winning touchdown.

 In the 2007–08 NFL playoffs, sometimes referred to as the "Snow Bowl", the Packers and Seahawks met again in the playoffs at Lambeau Field. The Seahawks jumped to a 14–0 lead in under five minutes in the 1st quarter, recovering two fumbles on consecutive drives by Packers running back Ryan Grant and scoring a touchdown each time. The Packers defense, however, only allowed two Seahawks field goals for the rest of the game. Grant went on to rush 27 times for 201 yards and scored 3 touchdowns; his 201 rushing yards set a team postseason record. Quarterback Brett Favre also threw for 3 touchdowns as the Packers beat the Seahawks 42–20. A large snowstorm dumped about 2 inches of snow during the game, limiting visibility for the players and fans watching on television. The Packers would go on to play in the NFC Championship game, losing to the eventual Super Bowl champion New York Giants.

 On September 24, 2012, the teams played a regular season game at the Seahawks' CenturyLink Field. It is remembered for the controversial last play, dubbed the "Fail Mary". Replacement officials were being used due to the 2012 NFL referee lockout. With the Packers leading 12–7 and only eight seconds left, Seattle quarterback Russell Wilson threw a desperation Hail Mary pass into the end zone. Packers safety M. D. Jennings and Seahawks wide receiver Golden Tate both jumped for the ball, and both maintained some contact with it in the air and upon landing on the ground. The two officials near the play conferred and then simultaneously made separate signals; side judge Lance Easley raised his arms to signal touchdown, while back judge Derrick Rhone-Dunn waved his arms to signal stoppage of the clock. Eventually, it was declared a touchdown, with Jennings and Tate ruled to have simultaneous possession (which is decided in favor of the offensive player), giving the Seahawks the win. Following the game, the NFL released an official statement that acknowledged that a pass interference penalty should have been called on Tate. Also, several of the regular NFL officials stated they would have ruled it an interception. The referee lockout ended a few days after the game, with NFL Commissioner Roger Goodell stating that the reaction by fans, players, and the media after the Fail Mary game "may have pushed the parties further along" in their contract negotiations.

 The teams clashed in the 2014 NFC Championship Game. Seattle was looking to repeat as Super Bowl champions, having defeated the Denver Broncos in Super Bowl XLVIII 43–8 the year before. However, Russell Wilson started poorly and his team was down 16–0 at halftime. The Seahawks finally scored on a fake field goal attempt; holder Jon Ryan threw a touchdown pass to Garry Gilliam. They were still down 19–7 with less than three minutes left, however. Wilson ran for a touchdown. Then, after a successful onside kick, Marshawn Lynch rushed for another touchdown, giving his team its first lead. Ahead 20–19, the Seahawks elected to go for a two-point conversion; Wilson came under intense pressure and was chased out of the pocket, but managed to loft a high, arcing pass to tight end Luke Willson, who took the ball into the end zone. That successful conversion proved to be crucial, as Packers quarterback Aaron Rodgers had enough time to drive down the field for a tying field goal. In overtime, Seattle won the coin toss, and Wilson threw a game-winning touchdown pass to Jermaine Kearse on the first possession.  The touchdown pass was Wilson's only pass meant for Kearse that was actually caught by Kearse; Green Bay intercepted four of the other five.

The teams have met four times in the playoffs, with the home team winning each time, and the Packers winning three. In addition to the three meetings cited above, Green Bay won 28–23 in the divisional round of the 2019–20 playoffs.

Statistics and records

Club success
As of 2020, the Packers and Seahawks have won a combined 14 championships in the league's history, including 5 Super Bowls.

 Table correct through Week 17 of the 2020 season.

Game results

|-
| 
| style="| Packers  27–20
| Milwaukee County Stadium
| Packers  1–0
| Seahawks join NFL as an expansion team and are placed in the NFC West, starting 0–10 in their inaugural season including this loss. The following season, they are moved to the AFC West, where they will remain through .
|-
| 
| style="| Packers   45–28
| Milwaukee County Stadium
| Packers  2–0
|
|-
| 
| style="| Packers   34–24
| Lambeau Field
| Packers  3–0
| 
|-
| 
| style="| Seahawks  24–13
| Milwaukee County Stadium
| Packers  3–1
| Seahawks' first win in series.
|-
| 
| style="| Seahawks  24–22
| Kingdome
| Packers  3–2
| First game in series hosted by Seattle.
|-
| 
| style="| Seahawks  30–24
| Milwaukee County Stadium
| Tied  3–3
| Final game in series played in Milwaukee; Packers commit fully to Green Bay after 1994.
|-
| 
| style="| Packers  30–24
| Kingdome
| Packers  4–3
| Packers win Super Bowl XXXI.
|-
| 
| style="| Seahawks  27–7
| Lambeau Field
| Tied  4–4
| Only Seahawks win in Lambeau Field to date. First Monday night game in series. First game in series for Mike Holmgren as Seahawks head coach after leaving the Packers following the previous season.
|-

|-
| 
| style="| Packers  27–20
| Lambeau Field
| Packers  5–4
| First matchup since 1976 in which both teams are part of the NFC. First face-off between former teammates Brett Favre and Matt Hasselbeck
|-
|-
! 2003 playoffs
! style="| Packers   33–27(OT)
! Lambeau Field
! Packers  6–4
! NFC Wild Card playoffs. First postseason game in series. Matt Hasselbeck guarantees game-winning drive for Seahawks in overtime after winning the coin toss, promptly tosses pick-six to lose the game on Seattle's second overtime possession.
|-
| 
| style="| Packers  23–17
| Lambeau Field
| Packers  7–4
| Seahawks lose Super Bowl XL.
|-
| 
| style="| Seahawks  34–24
| Qwest Field
| Packers  7–5
| Only win for Seahawks this decade.
|-
|-
! 2007 playoffs
! style="| Packers   42–20
! Lambeau Field
! Packers  8–5
! NFC Divisional playoffs. Packers overcome early 14–0 deficit. Last game in series for Favre.
|-
| 
| style="| Packers   27–17
| Qwest Field
| Packers  9–5
| First game in series for Aaron Rodgers. Last Packers win in Seattle to date. Last game in series for Holmgren as head coach.
|-
| 
| style="| Packers   48–10
| Lambeau Field
| Packers  10–5
| Last game in series for Hasselbeck.
|-

|-
| 
| style="| Seahawks   14–12
| CenturyLink Field
| Packers  10–6
| First meeting between Rodgers and Russell Wilson. Final play of the game is the controversial "Fail Mary" pass that results in Seahawks' win.
|-
| 
| style="| Seahawks   36–16
| CenturyLink Field
| Packers  10–7
| NFL Kickoff game. Seahawks lose Super Bowl XLIX.
|-
|-
! 2014 playoffs
! style="| Seahawks   28–22(OT)
! CenturyLink Field
! Packers  10–8
! NFC Championship Game. 
|-
| 
| style="| Packers   27–17
| Lambeau Field
| Packers  11–8
| 
|-
| 
| style="| Packers   38–10
| Lambeau Field
| Packers  12–8
|  
|-
| 
| style="| Packers   17–9
| Lambeau Field
| Packers  13–8
| 
|-
| 
| style="| Seahawks   27–24
| CenturyLink Field
| Packers  13–9
| First Thursday Night Football game between the two franchises.
|-
|-
! 2019 playoffs
! style="| Packers   28–23
! Lambeau Field
! Packers  14–9
! NFC Divisional playoffs. 
|-

|-
| 
| style="| Packers   17–0
| Lambeau Field
| Packers  15–9
| Final start in the series for Wilson.
|-

|-
| Regular season
| style="|
| 
| 
| Packers are 7–1 vs. Seahawks in Green Bay. Teams are tied 2–2 in Milwaukee; games there were counted as Packers home games.
|-
| Postseason
| style="|
| 
| 
| NFC Wild Card playoffs: 2003. NFC Divisional playoffs: 2007, 2019. NFC Championship Game: 2014.
|-
| Regular and postseason 
| style="|
| 
| 
| 
|-

Reference:

See also

National Football League rivalries

Notes

References

Green Bay Packers rivalries
National Football League rivalries
Seattle Seahawks
Seattle Seahawks rivalries